Hedgeley railway station served the area of Hedgeley, Northumberland, England from 1887 to 1953 on the Cornhill Branch.

History 
The station opened on 5 September 1887 by the North Eastern Railway. It was situated at the back of a sizable courtyard. There were four sidings, one having a loop, one running through the goods shed and another serving coal drops. The station closed to passengers on 22 September 1930 and to goods traffic on 2 March 1953.

References

External links 

Disused railway stations in Northumberland
Former North Eastern Railway (UK) stations
Railway stations in Great Britain opened in 1887
Railway stations in Great Britain closed in 1930
1887 establishments in England
1953 disestablishments in England